The women's tournament in Goalball at the 2016 Summer Paralympics was contested from 8 to 16 September. 28 matches were played; 20 in the group play, 4 quarter-finals, 2 semi-finals, a bronze medal match, and a gold medal match.

Ten teams participated, with six athletes per team.

Participating teams

Group C
 (roster)
 (roster)
 (roster)
 (roster)
 (roster)

Group D
 (roster)
 (roster)
 (roster)
 (roster)
 (roster)

Preliminary round

Group C

Group D

Knock-out round

Quarter-finals

Semi-finals

Bronze medal match

Gold medal match

Final rankings

Source: Paralympic.org

See also
Goalball at the 2016 Summer Paralympics – Men's tournament

References

External links

Women's tournament
2016 in women's sport